Mông Đồng (Chữ Hán: 艨艟) is a class of near-shore warship and riverine boat that played a dominant role in medieval Vietnamese naval forces for over a thousand years.

Gallery

Naval ships of Vietnam
Military history of Vietnam

zh:艨艟